The Church Lads' and Church Girls' Brigade is an Anglican youth organisation with branches in the United Kingdom, Ireland, Bermuda, Kenya, South Africa, Barbados, Newfoundland and St Helena. Its origins lie in the formation in 1891 of the Church Lads' Brigade with its sister organisation, the Church Red Cross Brigade, later the Church Girls' Brigade, founded in 1901. The two respective founders were Walter M. Gee and the Reverend Thomas Milner. The two brigades amalgamated in 1978 to form the Church Lads' and Church Girls' Brigade.

The Church Lads' Brigade was one of the founding members of The National Council for Voluntary Youth Services (NCVYS), and the Church Lads' and Church Girls' Brigade remains a member by virtue of its work towards the personal and social development of young people.

The brigade's patron saint is Martin of Tours. A banner depicting St Martin, which was presented by the brigade in 1921 to honour those members who died in the First World War, is kept at Westminster Abbey.

Structure 
The brigade is structured by location. Each location (normally a diocese, for example: Manchester) has a regiment or a diocesan battalion, this then divides into battalions (South, Central, North East - Durham, Oldham, Rochdale, Bolton, Tameside) and then into companies. Generally, each regiment has more than one battalion and each battalion has more than one company.

In Newfoundland, the brigade is composed of the Eastern Diocesan Regiment, split between the Avalon Battalion and the Trinity-Conception Battalion. Those battalions are further split into companies. There once were many more battalions, but unfortunately the brigade has seen a decrease in membership in recent years and many companies have now become defunct.

During the First World War the Church Lads' Brigade was instrumental in the creation of the Newfoundland Regiment and the 16th (Service) Battalion (Church Lads Brigade), King's Royal Rifle Corps, among other contributions to the war effort.

Sections 
The brigade is split into groups.  These correspond with the age of the members:

 The Martins (named after the patron saint): 4 to 7 years of age.
 The Y Team (previously YB & YGC: Young Boys and Young Girls Corp): 7 to 10 years of age.
 JTC (Jump To The Challenge (previously Junior Training Corps)): 10 to 13 years of age.
 Seniors: 13 to 21 years of age.
 Staff: 18 years onwards.

Members can become leaders and staff and continue to contribute to the CLCGB for long periods of time.

The following are the section designations for the CLB in Newfoundland:
 LTC (Little Training Corps.  Previously LBC: Little Boys Corps): 5 and 6 years of age.
 YTC (Young Training Corps.  Previously YBC: Young Boys Corps): 7 to 9 years of age.
 JTC (Junior Training Corps): 10 to 12 years of age.
 SC (Senior Corps.): 13 to 18 years of age.
 Staff: 19 years onwards.  Can include commissioned officers or non-uniformed instructors.

 Ranking system 

Newfoundland
In Newfoundland, LTC and YTC sections only ever hold the rank of "private". Privates bear no chevrons or sashes. Ranks that merit chevrons wear the chevron on the mid-upper arm, facing downward. Youth ranks that merit Crowns wear them on the lower arm, below the elbow. Officer ranks, be it in the form of pips, crowns, or both, are worn on both sides of the lapel.

JTC Section
Private 
Junior lance corporal (one chevron, on the right arm only)
Junior corporal (two chevrons, on the right arm only)
 Jr/L/Cpl and Jr/Cpl are considered "junior" non-commissioned officers (NCOs)

 Senior Section 
Private
Lance corporal (one chevron on each arm)
Corporal (two chevrons on each arm)
Lance sergeant (three chevrons on each arm; an N.C.O. Proficiency course is required to achieve this rank)
Sergeant (three chevrons and a green sash with a button emblazoned with the C.L.B. crest)
  Lance corporal to sergeant are NCOs, while WO2s and WO1s are warrant officers. 
Warrant officer, second class (two crowns, one on each arm, a red sash, and a drill cane)
 Many that hold this rank also hold the position of "sergeant major". The rank is often shortened to 'WO2' when addressing someone of this rank. A W.O. proficiency course, along with having been a sergeant for at least one year and being over the age of 17, is required to achieve this rank.
Warrant officer, first class (two crowns, one on each arm, and a drill cane) 
 Those who are awarded this rank also hold the position of "battalion sergeant major". For this reason, there are generally only two in the brigade at any given time. This rank can take on both the attributes of a senior section member or those of an officer, but wear an officer's uniform. 
 After achieving a warrant officer rank, members who move into the ranks of officers are given the privilege of skipping the "officer candidate" stage.

Officer ranks
Officer candidate 
 Often referred to as an 'O.C.' when being addressed, an O.C. is someone who has not yet completed officer proficiency and achieved the status of a full commissioned officer. They do not wear any sign of rank.
Second lieutenant (one pip on each lapel)
First lieutenant (two pips on each lapel)
Captain (three pips on each lapel)
Major (a crown on each lapel)
 Those who achieve the rank of major are usually on battalion, or regimental staff. Battalion commanders hold the rank of major.
Lieutenant colonel (one pip and a crown on each lapel)
 The regimental commander holds the rank of lieutenant colonel.
Colonel (a pip, a crown, and another pip on each lapel)
 The current (and past) governor and commandant holds the rank of colonel.

Activities

Company Night
Members will arrive and be instructed, subs will be taken before moving onto badgework. This can last between 10 minutes and an hour depending on the age of the children. The members are then instructed to fall in and perform drill, before moving onto games. Lastly, the Brigade Prayer is said before any notices are given out. Sweets are available at the end of the night.

Badgework
Badgework can take place in several different forms. A main part of the brigade is the Christian teachings that take place, this can be anything from a Christmas word search (used within the Martins) to complex teachings and encouragement of interpretation of passages from the bible.

Badgework is not just Christian teachings, many companies have been known to do The Duke of Edinburgh's Award. Other activities include cooking, arts & crafts, host and hostess, fitness, astronomy, first aid. Activities carried out are not subject to a certain 'curriculum'. The brigade publishes an official badge scheme and supply official badges to go on members' uniforms. Some companies choose to add their own certificates when they cannot find a suitable badge for an activity they would like to undertake.

Drill
This is quite similar to military foot drill. Many companies have a parade one Sunday a month; all members are required to attend a family service in church before parading around the parish, usually with a band. Due to the parades taking place, drill is practised on company nights. The length and complexity of drill varies with each section. By the time members reach JTC the older members are encouraged to take it in turns to command drill.

Camp
Taking groups away is a large part of the brigade, while there may be only two or three camps a year at company level, there are many more when escalated through battalion, regimental and national levels.

There are several national camps available, one being a trip to Butlins and another being 'spring adventure' (the location varies), these are both early in the year. While in these examples members are not in tents, many brigade companies choose to take their members on expeditions, sometimes working towards their Duke of Edinburgh's Award. Members are taught how to put a tent up, to cook for themselves and campsite etiquette.

In Newfoundland, week-long summer camps are offered for members of the JTC and SC sections, while in the fall and winter, weekend hiking and survival camps, known as "Challenge Camps" are held for members of the Senior Corps only. Many companies also offer their own camps so as to include their younger sections.

Sports
Members are encouraged to get involved with a number of sports, while games of various natures are played on company nights there are competitive events for football, netball, swimming, rounders and athletics. Some of these sports are used as competitions between battalions and then between regiments. This encourages members to meet people from other places and discuss the brigade with them.

For example, each February, battalions are invited to take part in a unihoc contest.  The different companies stay at Butlins, in Skegness for 2 or 3 nights.  Medals are awarded to the winning teams. Unihoc is a version of hockey, played with a puck, and plastic hockey sticks.  There is also an athletics competition in which regiments compete for the trophies.

Band
Many brigade companies in the United Kingdom also have a marching band, with instruments such as: drums, bugles, cymbals and glockenspiels.  Several bands also run successful brass and woodwind bands.  Brigades teach their members these instruments and encourage lessons outside the brigade.

Many battalions and regiments run their own band competitions for their member companies, there is also a National Band Competition for the bands to compete in which takes place annually around May time  within which many of the brigade companies take part from all over the country including Leicestershire, East Anglia and the North of England.

In Newfoundland, each battalion has its own marching band; a Drum and Bugle Band for the Avalon, and a Drum and Glockenspiel Band for the Trinity-Conception. More widely known however, is the Regimental Band, a marching band that also hosts concerts and events around the province.

Music played
Historically many companies have a large bugle section, therefore choosing to play bugle marches such as Assam Rifles (Winter), The Little Bugler (Duthoit) and Mechanised Infantry (McBain). Other companies that have a more pronounced brass and woodwind section will play more marches such as Aces High.

National Band
To support individual companies the CLCGB runs a National Band, aiming to extend the talents of its members by providing training and an opportunity to play in a band of over 60 members.  Summer tours have seen the band play across Britain, Europe and as far away as New York. The band play a variety of music, having a talented brass and woodwind section along with their accomplished traditional Drum Corps, Bugle Corps and mallet section.

National Choir
The brigade has a National Choir. Formed in 1991 the choir welcomes members from all regions in which the brigade operates and provides the opportunity for members to extend and express their vocal talents. It supports brigade events and performs three concerts in the autumn of each year. It has also in recent years played a central role in the brigade's annual service of remembrance held each November in the chapel of the National Memorial Arboretum at Alrewas, Staffordshire.

Membership of the choir has varied over the years from a low of about 25 to a high of nearly 50. The choir's repertoire covers a wide range from modern and popular classics to full choral pieces. In recent years a small band of accompanists has developed, including guitar, bass and percussion.

Historical Group
Formed in 1996, the Historical Group has made a positive contribution within the brigade. Its membership is very varied, encompassing all ages and interests, including members from Newfoundland, Canada and South Africa. We have built up a friendly and constructive relationship with the keepers of the Archives of the Newfoundland Church Lads’ Brigade and share material. We share a desire to learn about our heritage in a constructive way. Aiming to educate members using attractive and interactive methods and a new historical information sheet has been produced along with numerous factsheets. The cataloguing and conservation of the National Headquarters archives along with provision of a Reference Library have all now been initiated.

Membership brings with it the opportunity to receive the group's Brigader magazine twice a year and the Newfoundland CLB Bugle plus offers of merchandise not available from NHQ. The secretary can be contacted via NHQ.

Brigade Prayer
Members are encouraged to pray at least once on company nights. This prayer is the standard brigade prayer and is said all over the country.
'Heavenly Father, bless and guide with your spirit the work of the Church Lads' and Church Girls' Brigade. Help us never be ashamed to confess the faith of Christ crucified. To fight valiantly under his banner against sin, the world and the devil, and to continue as his faithful soldiers and servants to the end of our lives.  Amen'
Some companies, such as St James Brightlingsea, will say Grace at the end of the Brigade Prayer.
'The grace of our Lord Jesus Christ, and the love of God, and the fellowship of the Holy Spirit be with us all, evermore. Amen'

An alternate version of the Brigade Prayer is used in Newfoundland. The prayer is usually said at the beginning of a parade night, while the Grace is generally said at the end: 
'Grant O God, That we may never be ashamed to confess the faith of Christ crucified, and to faithfully fight under his banner against sin, the world, and the devil; to continue as his faithful soldiers and servants, unto our lives end. Through the same Jesus Christ our Lord, Amen.'

Cultural references 
The CLB is mentioned in the traditional Newfoundland song Recruiting Sargeant'', which honours the Royal Newfoundland Regiment. The ballad was made internationally famous in 1997 when it was covered by the Canadian folk rock band Great Big Sea.

References

External links
 

Youth organisations based in the United Kingdom
Christian youth organizations
Christian organizations established in 1978